In 1917, during the First World War, the armies on the Western Front continued to change their fighting methods, due to the consequences of increased firepower, more automatic weapons, decentralisation of authority and the integration of specialised branches, equipment and techniques into the traditional structures of infantry, artillery and cavalry. Tanks, railways, aircraft, lorries, chemicals, concrete and steel, photography, wireless and advances in medical science increased in importance in all of the armies, as did the influence of the material constraints of geography, climate, demography and economics. The armies encountered growing manpower shortages, caused by the need to replace the losses of 1916 and by the competing demands for labour by civilian industry and agriculture. Dwindling manpower was particularly marked in the French and German armies, which made considerable changes in their methods during the year, simultaneously to pursue military-strategic objectives and to limit casualties.

The French returned to a strategy of decisive battle in the Nivelle Offensive in April, using methods pioneered at the Battle of Verdun in December 1916, to break through the German defences on the Western front and return to a war of manoeuvre but ended the year recovering from the disastrous result. The German army attempted to avoid the high infantry losses of 1916 by withdrawing to new deeper and dispersed defences. Defence in depth was intended to nullify the growing material strength of the Allies, particularly in artillery and succeeded in slowing the growth of Anglo-French battlefield superiority. The British Expeditionary Force (BEF) continued its evolution into a mass army, capable of imposing itself on a continental power, took on much of the military burden borne by the French and Russian armies since 1914 and left the German army resorting to expedients to counter the development of its increasingly skilful use of fire-power and technology. During 1917 the BEF also encountered the manpower shortages affecting the French and Germans and at the Battle of Cambrai in December, received its biggest German attack since 1915, as German reinforcements began to flow from the Eastern Front.

Background
Paul von Hindenburg and Erich Ludendorff replaced Chief of the General Staff Erich von Falkenhayn on 19 August 1916, during "the most serious crisis of the war". On 2 September the new leadership ordered a strict defensive at Verdun and the dispatch of forces from there to reinforce the Somme and Romanian fronts. Hindenburg and Ludendorff visited the Western front and held a meeting at Cambrai on 8 September with the army group and other commanders, at which the gravity of the situation in France and the grim prospects for the new year were debated. Hindenburg and Ludendorff had already announced a reconnaissance on 6 September for a new, shorter line behind the Noyon salient. On 15 September a defensive strategy was announced except for Romania and  Rupprecht (commander of the northern army group on the Western front) was instructed to prepare a new line, Arras–St. Quentin–Laon–Aisne river.

The new line across the base of the Noyon salient would be about  shorter and was to be completed in three months. These defences were planned with the experience gained on the Somme, which showed a need for much greater defensive depth and many small shallow concrete -- ( shelters), rather than elaborate entrenchments and deep dug-outs, which had become man-traps. Concrete machine-gun nests and  shelters were built either side of the main line, with artillery observation posts built farther back to overlook it.

It was intended that the new defensive positions would contain any Allied breakthrough and give the German army the choice of a deliberate withdrawal, to dislocate an expected Allied offensive in the new year. Over the winter of 1916–1917, the wisdom of a deliberate withdrawal was debated and at a meeting on 19 December, called after the 15 December  during the Battle of Verdun, the possibility of a return to the offensive was also discussed. With a maximum of  expected to be available by March 1917, a decisive success was considered impossible.

Ludendorff continued to vacillate but in the end, the manpower crisis and the prospect of releasing thirteen divisions by a withdrawal on the Western Front, to the new  (Hindenburg line), overcame his desire to avoid the tacit admission of defeat it represented. The local retirements had been caused by the renewal of pressure by the British Fifth Army, as soon as weather permitted in January 1917, which had advanced  on a  front up the Ancre valley.

German defensive preparations, early 1917

Third OHL

Hindenburg and Ludendorff had demanded reinforcements from Falkenhayn to fight a decisive campaign against Russia and intrigued against Falkenhayn over his refusals. Falkenhayn held that decisive military victory against Russia was impossible and that the Western Front was the main theatre of the war. Soon after taking over from Falkenhayn, Hindenburg and Ludendorff had no choice but to recognise the wisdom of Falkenhayn's judgement that the Western Front was decisive, despite the crisis in the east caused by the Brusilov Offensive (4 June – 20 September) and the Rumanian declaration of war on 28 August.

Cambrai conference

The Battle of Verdun and the Battle of the Somme had been extraordinarily costly and on the Somme,  casualties had been suffered from 24 June to 28 August.

The 1st Army on the north side of the Somme reported on 28 August that,

It was known in Germany that the British had introduced conscription on 27 January 1916 and that despite the huge losses on the Somme, there would be no shortage of reinforcements. At the end of August, German military intelligence calculated that of the  divisions in France,  fresh. The French manpower situation was not as buoyant but by combing out rear areas and recruiting more troops from the colonies, the French could replace losses until the 1918 conscription class became available in the summer of 1917. Of the  divisions in France,  in reserve and another 10 to 11 divisions could be obtained by swapping tired units for fresh ones on quiet parts of the front.

Ludendorff admitted privately to Kuhl that victory appeared impossible, who wrote in his diary that

On 29 August, Hindenburg and Ludendorff reorganised the army groups on the Western Front, by incorporating all but the 4th Army in Flanders into the army group structure on the active part of the Western Front. The administrative reorganisation eased the distribution of men and equipment but made no difference to the lack of numbers and the growing Franco-British superiority in weapons and ammunition. New divisions were needed and the manpower for them and the replacement of the losses of 1916 had to be found.

Hindenburg Programme

The new programme was intended to create a trebling of artillery and machine-gun output and a doubling of munitions and trench mortar production. Expansion of the army and output of war materials caused increased competition for manpower between the army and industry. In early 1916, the German army had  in recruit depots and another  in March when the 1897 class of conscripts was called up. Hindenburg and Ludendorff ordered the creation of another  to reach  by early 1917.

The men for the divisions created by Falkenhayn had come from reducing square divisions with four infantry regiments to triangular divisions with three regiments, rather than a net increase in the number of men in the army. Troops for the extra divisions of the expansion ordered by Hindenburg and Ludendorff could be found by combing out rear-area units but most would have to be drawn from the pool of replacements, which had been depleted by the losses of 1916 and although new classes of conscripts would top up the pool, casualty replacement would become much more difficult once the pool had to maintain a larger number of divisions.

The German army had begun 1916 equally well-provided for in artillery and ammunition, massing  field and  heavy artillery shells for the beginning of the Battle of Verdun but four million rounds were fired in the first fortnight and the 5th Army needed about  trains a day to continue the battle. Before the war, Germany had imported nitrates for propellant manufacture and only the discovery of the Haber process, to synthesise nitrates from atmospheric nitrogen, enabled Germany to continue the war; developing the Haber process and building factories to exploit it took time. Under Falkenhayn, the procurement of ammunition and the guns to fire it, had been based on the output of propellants, since the manufacture of ammunition without sufficient propellant fillings, was as wasteful of resources as it was pointless but Hindenburg and Ludendorff wanted firepower to replace manpower and ignored the principle.

To meet existing demand and to feed new weapons, Hindenburg and Ludendorff wanted a big increase in propellant output to  a month. The industrial mobilisation needed to fulfil the Hindenburg Programme increased demand for skilled workers,  (recalled from the army) or exempted from conscription. The number of  increased from  men, of whom  deemed  (kv, fit for front line service), at the end of 1916 to  men in October 1917 and more than two million by November,  being kv. The demands of the Hindenburg Programme exacerbated the manpower crisis and constraints on the availability of raw materials meant that targets were not met.

The German army returned  workers to the war economy and exempted  from conscription, from  1917. Despite the shortfalls, by the summer of 1917, the  artillery park had increased from   guns and from   guns, many being newer models of superior performance. The increased output was insufficient to equip the new divisions and divisions which still had two artillery brigades with two regiments lost a regiment and the brigade headquarters, leaving three regiments. Against the new scales of equipment, British divisions in early 1917 had  and  machine-guns and the French  and  machine-guns.

Defensive battle
In a new manual of 1 December 1916,  (Principles of Command for Defensive Battle), the policy of unyielding defence of ground regardless of its tactical value, was replaced by the defence of positions suitable for artillery observation and communication with the rear, where an attacking force would "fight itself to a standstill and use up its resources while the defenders conserve[d] their strength". A  (rear battle zone) further back was to be occupied by the reserve battalion of each regiment.

Field fortification
 (Principles of Field Fortification) was published in January 1917 and by April an outpost zone held by sentries, had been built along the Western Front. Defensive procedures in the battle zone were similar but with greater numbers. Such a decentralised battle by large numbers of small infantry detachments would present the attacker with unforeseen obstructions. Resistance from troops equipped with automatic weapons, supported by observed artillery fire, would increase the further the advance progressed. A school was opened in January 1917 to teach infantry commanders the new methods.

If the immediate counter-attack failed, the counter-attack divisions would take their time to prepare a methodical attack if the lost ground was essential to the retention of the main position. Such methods required large numbers of reserve divisions ready to move to the battlefront. The reserve was obtained by creating  by internal reorganisation of the army, bringing divisions from the eastern front and by shortening the western front, in Operation Alberich.

Somme analysis
Experience of the German 1st Army in the Somme Battles, was published on 30 January 1917. Ludendorff's new defensive methods had been controversial; during the Battle of the Somme in 1916 Colonel Fritz von Loßberg (Chief of Staff of the 1st Army) had been able to establish a line of relief divisions, with the reinforcements from Verdun, which began to arrive in greater numbers in September. In his analysis of the battle, Loßberg opposed the granting of discretion to front trench garrisons to retire, as he believed that manoeuvre did not allow the garrisons to evade Allied artillery fire, which could blanket the forward area and invited enemy infantry to occupy vacant areas.

Loßberg considered that spontaneous withdrawals would disrupt the counter-attack reserves as they deployed and further deprive battalion and division commanders of the ability to conduct an organised defence, which the dispersal of infantry over a wider area had already made difficult. Loßberg and others had severe doubts as to the ability of relief divisions to arrive on the battlefield in time to conduct an immediate counter-attack from behind the battle zone. The sceptics wanted the Somme practice of fighting in the front line to be retained and authority devolved no further than battalion, so as to maintain organizational coherence, in anticipation of a methodical counter-attack after  by the relief divisions. Ludendorff was sufficiently impressed by Loßberg's memorandum to add it to the new Manual of Infantry Training for War.

General Ludwig von Falkenhausen, commander of the 6th Army, arranged his infantry in the Arras area according to Loßberg and Hoen's preference for a rigid defence of the front-line, supported by methodical counter-attacks, by the "relief" divisions on the second or third day. About  behind, were the Wancourt–Feuchy and to the north the Point du Jour lines, running from the Scarpe river north along the east slope of Vimy ridge.

The new , which extended the Hindenburg position, was built around  further back and not entirely mapped by the Allies until the battle had begun. Just before the battle, Falkenhausen had written that parts of the front line might be lost but the five  could be brought forward, to relieve the front divisions on the evening of the second day. On 6 April, General von Nagel, the 6th Army Chief of Staff, accepted that some of the front divisions might need to be relieved on the first evening of battle but that any penetrations would be repulsed with local immediate counter-attacks by the front divisions.

On 7 April, Nagel viewed the imminent British attack as a limited effort against Vimy Ridge, preparatory to a bigger attack later, perhaps combined with the French attack expected in mid-April. Construction of positions to fulfil the new policy of area defence, had been drastically curtailed by shortages of labour and the long winter, which affected the setting of concrete. The 6th Army commanders had also been reluctant to encourage the British to change their plans, if they detected a thinning of the front line. The commanders were inhibited by the extent of British air reconnaissance, which observed new field works and promptly directed artillery fire on them. The 6th Army failed to redeploy its artillery, which remained in lines easy to see and bombard. Work on defences was also divided between maintaining the front line, strengthening the third line and the new  (Drocourt–Quéant switch line) further back.

Corps were detached from their component divisions and given permanent areas to hold, named after the commander and then under a geographical title from 3 April 1917. The VIII Reserve Corps holding the area north of Givenchy became  Souchez, I Bavarian Reserve Corps became  Vimy and held the front from Givenchy to the Scarpe river with three divisions,  Arras (IX Reserve Corps) was responsible for the line from the Scarpe to Croisilles and  Quéant (XIV Reserve Corps) from Croisilles to Mœuvres. Divisions would move into the area and come under the authority of the group for the duration of their term, then be replaced by fresh divisions.

Using the new defensive system, the 18th Division in the German 1st Army, held an area of the Hindenburg Position with an outpost zone along a ridge near La Vacquerie and a main line of resistance  behind. The three regiments held sectors with two battalions in the outpost and battle zones and one in reserve, several miles to the rear (this deployment was reversed later in the year). The two battalions were side by side, with three companies in the outpost zone and front trenches, one in the battle zone and four or five fortified areas within it, built of concrete and sited for all-round-defence, held by one or two , each with eleven men and an NCO with a machine-gun and;  companies remained in each front battalion area for mobile defence; during attacks the reserve battalion was to advance and occupy the Hindenburg line. The new dispositions doubled the area held by a unit, compared to July 1916 on the Somme.

The British set-piece attack, early 1917

Division attack training

In December 1916, the training manual  replaced  of 8 May 1916 and marked a significant step in the evolution of the British Expeditionary Force (BEF) into a homogeneous force, well adapted to its role on the Western Front. The duties of army, corps and divisions in planning attacks were standardised. Armies were to devise the plan and the principles of the artillery component. Each corps was to allot tasks to divisions, which would then select objectives and devise infantry plans subject to corps approval. Artillery planning was controlled by corps with consultation of divisions by the corps General Officer Commanding, Royal Artillery (GOCRA) which became the title of the officer at each level of command who devised the bombardment plan, which was coordinated with neighbouring corps artillery commanders by the army GOCRA. Specific parts of the bombardment were nominated by divisions, using their local knowledge and the results of air reconnaissance. The corps artillery commander was to co-ordinate counter-battery fire and the howitzer bombardment for zero hour. Corps controlled the creeping barrage but divisions were given authority over extra batteries added to the barrage, which could be switched to other targets by the divisional commander and brigade commanders.  provided the basis for the BEF's operational technique for the rest of 1917.

Platoon attack training
The training manual  of February 1917 marked the end of attacks made by lines of infantry with a few detached specialists. The platoon was divided into a small headquarters and four sections, one with two trained grenade-throwers and assistants, the second with a Lewis gunner and nine assistants carrying  of ammunition, the third section comprised a sniper, scout and nine riflemen and the fourth section had nine men with four rifle-grenade launchers. German defenders were to be suppressed by fire from the Lewis-gun and rifle-grenade sections, while the riflemen and hand-grenade sections moved forward, preferably by infiltrating round the flanks of the resistance, to overwhelm the defenders from the rear.

The changes in equipment, organisation and formation were elaborated in  The Normal Formation For the Attack of February 1917, which recommended that the leading troops should push on to the final objective, when only one or two were involved but that for a greater number of objectives, when artillery covering fire was available for the depth of the intended advance, fresh platoons should leap-frog through the leading platoons to the next objective. The new organisations and equipment gave the infantry platoon the capacity for fire and manoeuvre, even in the absence of adequate artillery support. To bring uniformity in adoption of the methods laid down in the revised manuals and others produced over the winter, Haig established a BEF Training Directorate in January 1917, to issue manuals and oversee training.  and its companion manuals like  provided British infantry with "off-the-peg" tactics, devised from the experience of the Somme and from French Army operations, to go with the new equipment made available by increasing British and Allied war production and better understanding of the organisation necessary to exploit it in battle.

British offensive preparations

Planning for operations in 1917 began in late 1916. Third Army staff made their proposals for what became the Battle of Arras on 28 December, beginning a process of consultation and negotiation with GHQ. Sir Douglas Haig, Commander-in-Chief of the BEF, studied this draft and made amendments, resulting in a more cautious plan for the infantry advance. General Edmund Allenby, in command of the Third Army proposed to use Corps mounted troops and infantry to press ahead beyond the main body, which was accepted by Haig, since the new dispersed German defensive organisation gave more scope to cavalry. Third Army's claims on manpower, aircraft, tanks and gas were agreed and its corps were instructed to make their plans according to  Instructions for the Training of Divisions for Offensive Action of December 1916. Behind the lines (defined as the area not subject to German artillery fire) improvements in infrastructure and supply organisation made in 1916, had led to the creation of a Directorate-General of Transportation (10 October 1916) and a Directorate of Roads (1 December) allowing army headquarters to concentrate on operations.

Allenby and his artillery commander planned a  bombardment based on the experience of the Somme, apart from its relatively short duration, after which the infantry were to advance deep into the German defences, then move sideways to envelop areas where the Germans had held their ground. The   projectors and  massed in the Third and First armies, were deployed in relation to the length of front, the quantity of wire to be cut and availability of the new fuze 106. Guns and howitzers were allotted according to their calibre and the nature of the targets to be engaged. Several barrages were planned for the attack, which deepened the area under bombardment. Great stress was laid on counter-battery fire under a Counter-Battery Staff Officer with the use of sound ranging to find the positions of German artillery.

A short bombardment was over-ruled by Haig and Allenby's artillery commander was promoted out of the way and replaced by Major-General R. St. C. Lecky, who wanted a longer bombardment, as did Major-General Herbert Uniacke, loaned by the Fifth Army during Lecky's absence through illness. In conferences with his corps commanders, Allenby used a consultative style at first, encouraging the corps commanders to solicit suggestions from subordinates (26 February) but later changed bombardment and counter-battery plans without discussion (2 March), although his instructions to the Cavalry Corps gave the commander freedom of action in liaison with the other corps. During the course of the battle Allenby (Third Army Artillery Instructions No.13, 19 April 1917) recommended that artillery batteries should be set aside to deal with German counter-attacks, which had become more effective as the Germans recovered from the initial shock of the attack, to be linked to the front by wireless and registered on probable German forming-up places. On 19 April, Notes on Points of Instructional Value, was circulated as far as battalions, showing the increased effort being made to address the chronic difficulty in communication once operations commenced.

Matters were similarly settled in the First Army further north, which had responsibility for the capture of Vimy Ridge, to form a flank guard to the Third Army. The commander Lieutenant-General Sir Henry Horne, maintained a consultative style in contrast to Allenby's move towards prescriptive control. On 18 March, the XI Corps commander, Lieutenant-General Richard Haking, drew attention to two of his divisions, which were holding a four-division front and Horne explained the vital nature of the attack on the ridge, by I Corps and the Canadian Corps further south. Conferences with the corps commanders on 29 March and 15 April, discussed the corps commanders' opinions on the possibility of a German withdrawal, road allocations and catering arrangements for the troops in the line, the vital importance of troops communicating with contact aeroplanes and artillery and the dates by which the corps commanders felt able to attack.

XVII Corps
XVII Corps issued a 56-page plan of "Instructions on which Divisional Commanders are to work out their own plans in detail...", which incorporated experience gained on the Somme and stressed the importance of co-ordinated machine-gun fire, counter-battery artillery fire, creeping barrages, the leapfrogging of infantry units, pauses on objectives and plans to meet German counter-attacks. Mortar and gas units were delegated to divisional control. Tank operations remained a corps responsibility, as they were to conform to an army plan against selected objectives. A Corps Signals Officer was appointed, to co-ordinate artillery communications on lines later elaborated in  Forward Inter-Communication in Battle of March 1917, going into the details of telephone line planning, to link units with each other, neighbours and their artillery, along with telegraph, visual signalling, pigeons, power buzzers, wireless, codes and liaison with the Royal Flying Corps (RFC).

Much of the corps planning covered artillery, detailing the guns to move forward behind the infantry and their new positions. Artillery liaison officers were appointed to infantry units and field guns and howitzers were reserved to engage German counter-attacks. It was laid down that artillery supporting a neighbouring division was to come under the command of that division. For the first time all artillery was integrated into one plan. Planning for the Battle of Arras showed that command relationships, especially within the artillery (which had evolved a parallel system of command, so that General Officers Commanding, Royal Artillery at corps and division were much more closely integrated) and standardisation, had become more evident between armies, corps and divisions. Analysis and codification of the lessons of the Somme and the process of supplying the armies, made the BEF much less dependent on improvisation. Discussion and dissent between army, corps and division was tolerated, although it was not uniformly evident. Staffs were more experienced and were able to use a formula for set-piece attacks, although the means for a higher tempo of operations had not been achieved, because of the artillery's reliance on observed fire, which took time to complete. The loss of communication with troops once they advanced, still left their commanders ignorant of events when their decisions were most needed.

Division
Intelligence Officers were added to divisions, to liaise with headquarters as their units moved forward and to report on progress, increasing the means by which commanders could respond to events. Training for the attack had begun in the 56th (1/1st London) Division in late March, mainly practising for open warfare ("greeted with hilarity") with platoons organised according to  Instructions from the corps headquarters restricted light signals to the artillery to green for "open fire" and white for "increase the range" and laid down the strength of battalions, the number of officers and men to be left out of battle and formed into a Divisional Depot Battalion. The two attacking brigades returned to the line on 1 April, giving them plenty of time to study the ground before the attack on 9 April.

On 15 April, during the Battle of Arras, VI Corps forwarded to Allenby a report that a conference of the commanders of the 17th (Northern) Division, 29th Division and the 50th (Northumbrian) Division and the corps Brigadier-General General Staff (BGGS), had resolved that the recent piecemeal attacks should stop and that larger coordinated actions should be conducted after a pause to reorganise, which Allenby accepted. On 17 April, the 56th (1/1st London) Division commander objected to an operation planned for 20 April, due to the exhaustion of his troops. The division was withdrawn instead, when the VI and VII corps commanders and General Horne, the First Army commander also pressed for a delay.

VI Corps delegated the barrage arrangements for the attack on 23 April to the divisions involved, which included variations in the speed of the barrage determined by the state of the ground. Reference was made in Third Army Artillery Instructions No.12 (18 April) to  Instructions on the Use of Lethal and Lachrymatory Shell and an Army memo, regarding low flying German aeroplanes, called attention to  Notes on Firing at Aircraft with Machine Guns and Other Small Arms. Third Army Headquarters also gave its corps permission to delegate command of tanks to divisions for the Second Battle of the Scarpe (23–24 April), discretion over local matters being increasingly left to divisional commanders, with corps retaining control over matters affecting the conduct of the battle in general.

British methodical attacks

After 12 April, Haig decided that the advantage gained by the Third and First armies since 9 April, had run its course and that further attacks must resume a methodical character. British intelligence estimated that nine German divisions had been relieved with nine fresh ones. On 20 April, after the commencement of the French attacks of the Nivelle offensive, Haig believed that the German reserve had fallen from  divisions but that thirteen tired divisions were recovering and that there were ten new divisions available for the Western Front. With the reliefs due on the French front, only about eleven fresh divisions would remain to oppose further British operations, which were conducted until early May.

German defensive changes
The first days of the British Arras offensive, saw another German defensive  similar to that at Verdun on 15 December 1916, despite an analysis of that failure being issued swiftly, which concluded that deep dug-outs in the front line and an absence of reserves for immediate counter-attacks, were the cause of the defeat. At Arras similarly obsolete defences over-manned by infantry, were devastated by artillery and swiftly overrun, leaving the local reserves with little choice but to try to contain further British advances and wait for the relief divisions, which were too far away to counter-attack. A more practical change, was the despatch of Loßberg from his post as Chief of Staff of the German 1st Army, (due to move south to join the armies on the Aisne) to the 6th Army, replacing Nagel on 11 April. Falkenhausen was sacked on 23 April and replaced by General Otto von Below.

He confirmed the decision made to withdraw from the Wancourt salient and the foot of Vimy Ridge, accepting that a rigid forward defence was impossible given British observation from the ridge. North of the Scarpe, the front garrison was given permission to withdraw during British attacks, from the battle zone to its rear edge, where it would counter-attack with the reserves held back there and mingle with retreating British infantry, to evade British observed artillery fire; after dark the German infantry would be redeployed in depth under cover. South of the Scarpe, the loss of Monchy-le-Preux also gave the British observation over German positions. Loßberg mapped a new line beyond the range of British field artillery, to be the back of a new battle zone (the ). A rearward battle zone  backed on to the Wotan line, which was nearing completion.

Despite Loßberg's doubts about elastic defence, the circumstances he found on the 6th Army front made resort to it unavoidable. With artillery reinforcements arriving, the first line of defence was to be a heavy barrage on the British front line, at the commencement of a British attack, followed by direct and indirect machine-gun fire on the British infantry, as they tried to advance through the German battle zone, followed by infantry counter-attacks by local reserves and  divisions (if needed) to regain the front position. Machine-guns were not to be placed in special defended localities as in the  but to be moved among shell-holes and improvised emplacements, as the situation demanded. Artillery was concealed in the same manner, lines of guns were abolished and guns were placed in folds of ground and frequently moved, to mislead British air observation, which was made easier by a period of poor weather. The new deployment was ready by 13 April; the remnants of the original front-line divisions had been withdrawn and replaced by nine fresh divisions, with six more brought into the area, as new  divisions.

The British set-piece attack, mid-1917

5th Army

Sir Douglas Haig chose General Hubert Gough, commander of the Fifth Army to lead the offensive from the Ypres salient. Gough held the first conference in late 24 May, before he moved his headquarters to the Salient. II Corps, XIX Corps, XVIII Corps and XIV Corps were to be under the command of the Fifth Army and IX Corps, X Corps and II Anzac Corps in the Second Army. As early decisions were subject to change, detail was avoided, planners were to draw on "Preparatory measures to be taken by Armies and Corps before undertaking operations on a large scale" of February 1916 and  It was decided to have four divisions per corps, two for the attack and two in reserve, with staff from the reserve division headquarters taking over before the original divisions were relieved. On 31 May Gough, dealt with a letter from the XVIII Corps commander Lieutenant-General Ivor Maxse objecting to dawn attacks, since a later time gave troops more rest before the attack. Maxse also wanted to go beyond the black line (second objective) to the Steenbeek stream, to avoid stopping on a forward slope. Gough replied that he had to consider the wishes of all the corps commanders but agreed with the wisdom of trying to gain as much ground as possible, which Gough felt had not been achieved by the Third Army at Arras.

In 1915, the biggest operation of the BEF had been by one army, with three corps and nine divisions. In 1916, two armies, nine corps and  fought the Battle of the Somme, without the benefit of the decades of staff officer experience that continental conscript armies could take for granted. Details had become routine, as more staff officers gained experience, allowing more delegation.

Great emphasis was placed on getting information back to headquarters and making troops independent within the plan, to allow a higher tempo ("The rate or rhythm of activity relative to the enemy".) of operations, by freeing attacking troops from the need to refer back for orders. Corps commanders planned the attack in the framework given by the army commander and planning in the Second Army followed the same system. In mid-June, the corps in the Second Army corps were asked to submit their attack plans and requirements to carry them out. When the II Corps boundary was moved south in early July, the Second Army attack became mainly a decoy, except for the 41st Division (X Corps), for which special liaison arrangements were made with II Corps and the covering artillery.

A rolling offensive would need fewer periods of intense artillery fire, which would allow guns to be moved forward ready for the next stage. Gough stressed the need to plan for opportunities to take ground left temporarily undefended and that this was more likely in the first attack,

Haig arranged a meeting with Davidson, Gough and Plumer on 28 June, where Plumer supported the Gough plan. Maxse the XVIII Corps commander, left numerous sarcastic comments in the margins of his copy of the Davidson memo, to the effect that he was being too pessimistic. Davidson advocated views which were little different from those of Gough, except for Gough wanting to make additional arrangements, to allow undefended ground to be captured by local initiative.

XIV Corps
At the conference on 6 June, Gough took the view that if the Germans were thoroughly demoralised, it might be possible to advance to parts of the red line on the first day. Maxse and Rudolph Cavan (XIV Corps), felt that the range of their artillery would determine the extent of their advance and that it would need to be moved forward for the next attack. Gough drew a distinction between advancing against disorganised enemy forces, which required bold action and attacks on organised forces, which needed careful preparation, particularly of the artillery which would take three to seven days. Maxse's preference for a later beginning for the attack was agreed, except by Lieutenant-General Herbert Watts, the XIX Corps commander. A memorandum was issued summarising the conference, in which Gough stressed his belief in the need for front-line commanders to use initiative and advance into vacant or lightly occupied ground beyond the objectives laid down, without waiting for orders. Relieving tired troops, gave time to the enemy, so a return to deliberate methods would be necessary afterwards. Judging the time for this was reserved for the army commander, who would rely on the reports of subordinates.

Communication by the Fifth Army corps to their divisions, reflected the experience of Vimy and Messines, the value of aerial photography for counter-battery operations, raiding and the construction of scale models of the ground to be covered, the divisional infantry plans, machine-gun positions, mortar plans and positions, trench tramways, places chosen for supply dumps and headquarters, signals and medical arrangements and camouflage plans. The Corps was responsible for heavy weapons, infrastructure and communication. In XIV Corps, divisions were to liaise with 9 Squadron RFC for training and to conduct frequent rehearsals of infantry operations, to give commanders experience in dealing with unexpected occurrences, which were more prevalent in semi-open warfare.

XIV Corps held a conference of divisional commanders on 14 June and Cavan emphasised the importance of using the new manuals  Fifth Army document  in planning the offensive. Discussion followed on the means by which the Guards Division and 38th Division were to meet the army commander's intent. The decision to patrol towards the red line, was left to the discretion of divisional commanders. Notes were later sent to the divisions, from the next army conference held on 19 June.

At a conference held by Gough on 26 June, the record , was written up as the operation order for the attack of 31 July, in which the final objective for the first day, was moved forward from the black to the green line and infiltration envisaged from it towards the red line. Responsibility delegated to the divisions for the attack, would revert to corps and Fifth Army headquarters, when the green line was reached. In Gough's Instruction of 27 June, he alluded to Davidson's concern about a ragged front line, by reminding the Corps commanders that a "clearly defined" line was needed for the next advance and that control of artillery would be devolved to the corps. Gough issued another memorandum on 30 June, summarising the plan and referring to the possibility that the attack would move to open warfare after 36 hours, noting that this might take several set-piece battles to achieve.

XVIII Corps issued Instruction No. 1 on 30 June, describing the intention to conduct a rolling offensive, where each corps would have four divisions, two for the attack and two in reserve, ready to move through the attacking divisions for the next attack. Separate units were detailed for patrolling, once the green line was reached and some cavalry were attached. Divisions were to build strongpoints and organise liaison with neighbouring divisions, with these groups given special training over model trenches. Ten days before zero, divisions were to send liaison officers to Corps Headquarters. Machine-gun units were to be under corps control, until the black line was reached then devolve to divisions, ready to sweep the Steenbeek valley and cover the advance to the green line by the 51st and 39th divisions. Tanks were attached to the divisions, under arrangements decided by the divisions and some wireless tanks were made available. Gas units remained under corps control, a model of the ground was built for all ranks to inspect and it was arranged that two maps per platoon would be issued. Plans for air-ground communication went into considerable detail. Aircraft recognition markings were given and the flares to be lit by the infantry when called for by contact aeroplanes was laid down, as were recognition marks for battalion and brigade headquarters; dropping stations were created to receive information from aircraft. Ground communication arrangements were made according to the manual  Appendices covered Engineer work on roads, rail, tramways and water supply; intelligence arrangements covered the use balloons, contact aeroplanes, Forward Observation Officers, prisoners, returning wounded, neighbouring formations and wireless eavesdropping. Corps Observers were attached to brigades, to patrol forward once the black line was reached, to observe the area up to the green line, judge the morale of the Germans opposite and see if they were preparing to counter-attack or retire, passing the information to a divisional Advanced Report Centre.

Guards Division
Training for the northern attack (31 July) began in early June, with emphasis on musketry and attacks on fortified positions. The Guards Division Signals Company trained  from each brigade as relay runners, additional to the other means of tactical communication. Major-General Fielding held a conference on 10 June, to discuss the division's place in the XIV Corps scheme, for the attack east and north-east of Boesinghe. Four "bounds" were to be made to the blue, black, green and dotted green lines, bypassing isolated German posts, which were to be dealt with by reserves. Depending on the state of the German defence, ground was to be taken up to the red line by patrols. Captured German trench lines were to be consolidated and advanced posts established beyond them. Parties were to be detailed for liaison with neighbouring units and divisions. Six brigades of field artillery were available for the creeping barrage and the division's three machine-gun companies were reinforced by a company from the 29th Division for the machine-gun barrage. Times when contact patrol aircraft were to fly overhead observing progress were given. The only light signals allowed were the flares for contact aircraft and the rifle grenade SOS signal.

A divisional conference on 18 June, discussed the plans of the 2nd and 3rd Guards Brigades and their liaison arrangements, with 38th Division to the right and the French 1st Division on the left. The divisional reserve of the 1st Guards Brigade, was to exploit success by forcing a crossing of the Steenbeek and consolidating a bridgehead on the far bank. If the Germans collapsed, it was to advance to a line east of Langemarck and Wijdendreft.

The 8th Division moved to Flanders a few days before the Battle of Messines Ridge  and joined XIV Corps in Second Army reserve. On 11 June, the division came under II Corps and began to relieve parts of 33rd Division and the 55th Division on the Menin Road at Hooge. Major-General William Heneker was able to persuade Gough to cancel a preliminary operation and include it in the main attack. On 12 July, the Germans conducted their first mustard gas attack on the divisional rear areas and artillery lines. Two brigades were to advance to the blue line with two battalions each, with the other two to pass through to the black line; four tanks were attached to each brigade. The 25th Brigade would then attack the green line, assisted by twelve tanks. One battalion with tanks and cavalry would then be ready to advance to the red line, depending on the state of German resistance and the 25th Division would be in reserve, ready to attack beyond the red line.

After a night raid on 11 July, the division was relieved by the 25th Division and began training intensively for trench-to-trench attacks, on ground marked to represent German positions on the objective. A large model was built and a large-scale map produced for officers and men to study and reconnaissance was conducted by officers and staffs to see the ground up to the objective. On 23 July, the division returned to the front line and commenced raiding, to take prisoners and to watch for a local withdrawal, while tunnelling companies prepared large underground chambers, to shelter the attacking infantry before the offensive began.

German defensive preparations, June–July 1917

Northern France and Flanders was held by Army Group Crown Prince Rupprecht, which by the end of July had  The defence of the Ypres Salient was the responsibility of the German 4th Army, under the command of General Friedrich Bertram Sixt von Armin. The divisions of the 4th Army were organised in groups based on the existing corps organisation.  Lille ran from the southern army boundary to Warneton.  Wytschaete continued north to Bellewaarde Lake,  Ypres held the line to the Ypres–Staden railway,  Dixmude held the ground from north of the railway to Noordschoote and  Nord held the coast with Marinekorps Flandern.

The 4th Army defended  of front with  Dixmude based on the German XIV Corps headquarters,  Ypres (III Bavarian Corps) and  Wytschaete (IX Reserve Corps);  Staden (Guards Reserve Corps) was added later.  Dixmude held , with four front divisions and two  divisions;  Ypres held  from Pilckem to Menin Road, with three front divisions and two  divisions and  Wytschaete held a similar length of front south of Menin Road with three front divisions and three  divisions. The  divisions were placed behind the Menin and Passchendaele Ridges;  further back were four more  divisions and  beyond them another two in "Group of Northern Armies" reserve.

Behind ground-holding divisions was a line of  divisions. The term  had been dropped before the French offensive in mid-April, to avoid confusion over their purpose, the word   ("interlock", "dovetail" or "intervene") being substituted. The 207th Division, 12th Division and 119th Division supported  Wytschaete, the 221st Division and 50th Reserve Division were in  Ypres and 2nd Guard Reserve Division supported  Dixmude. The 79th Reserve Division and 3rd Reserve Division were based at Roulers, in Army Group reserve.  Ghent, with the 23rd Division and 9th Reserve Division was concentrated around Ghent and Bruges, with the 5th Bavarian Division based at Antwerp, in case of a British landing in the Netherlands.

The Germans were apprehensive of a British attempt to exploit the victory at the Battle of Messines, with an advance to the Tower Hamlets spur, beyond the north end of Messines Ridge. On 9 June, Rupprecht proposed withdrawing to the  line in the area east of Messines. Construction of defences began but were terminated after Loßberg was appointed as the new Chief of Staff of the 4th Army. Loßberg rejected the proposed withdrawal to the  line and ordered that the front line east of the Oosttaverne line be held rigidly. In between the German defence positions lay the Belgian villages of Zonnebeke and Passchendaele.

On 30 June, Kuhl, suggested a withdrawal to the  along Passchendaele Ridge, meeting the old front line in the north near Langemarck and at Armentières to the south. Such a withdrawal would avoid a hasty retreat from Pilckem Ridge and also force the British into a time-consuming redeployment. Loßberg disagreed, believing that the British would launch a broad front offensive, that the ground east of the Oosttaverne line was easy to defend, that the Menin Road Ridge could be held and that Pilckem Ridge deprived the British of ground observation over the Steenbeek valley, while German observation of the area from Passchendaele Ridge allowed the infantry to be supported by observed artillery fire.

The 4th Army operation order for the defensive battle was issued on 27 June.

The failures at Verdun in December 1916 and at Arras in April 1917 had given more importance to these areas, since the  had been overrun during both offensives and the garrisons lost.

Loßberg rejected elastic defence tactics in Flanders, because there was little prospect of operational pauses between British attacks towards . The British had such a mass of artillery and the infrastructure to supply it with huge amounts of ammunition, much of which had been built after the attack at Messines in early June. Loßberg ordered that the front line be fought for at all costs and immediate counter-attacks delivered to recapture lost sectors. Loßberg reiterated his belief that a trench garrison which retired in a zone of fire quickly became disorganised and could not counter-attack, losing the sector and creating difficulties for troops on the flanks.

Counter-attack was to be the main defensive tactic, since local withdrawals would only disorganise the troops moving forward to their assistance. Front line troops were not expected to cling to shelters, which were man traps but leave them as soon as the battle began, moving forward and to the flanks, to avoid enemy fire and to counter-attack. German infantry equipment had recently been improved by the arrival of  machine-guns (equivalent to the British Lewis gun) per regiment. The extra firepower gave the German unit better means for fire and manoeuvre. The essence of all of these defensive preparations was riposte, in accordance with the view of Carl von Clausewitz, that defence foreshadows attack.

The British set-piece attack, late 1917

2nd Army
Staff at GHQ of the BEF, quickly studied the results of the attack of 31 July and on 7 August sent questions to the army headquarters, on how to attack in the new conditions produced by German defence-in-depth using strong points, pillboxes and rapid counter-attacks by local reserves and  divisions. Plumer replied on 12 August, placing more emphasis on mopping up captured ground, making local reserves available to deal with hasty local counter-attacks and having larger numbers of reserves available to crush organised counter-attacks. After a conference with the Corps commanders on 27 August, Plumer issued "Notes on Training and Preparation for Offensive Operations" on 31 August, which expanded on his reply to GHQ, describing the need for attacks with more depth and more scope for local initiative, enabled by unit commanders down to the infantry company keeping a reserve ready to meet counter-attacks.

Plumer issued a "Preliminary Operations Order" on 1 September, defining an area of operations from Broodseinde southwards. Four corps with fourteen divisions, were to be involved in the attack. Five of the thirteen Fifth Army divisions, extended the attack northwards to the Ypres–Staden railway; the process of arranging the attack involved the divisions soon afterwards. New infantry formations were introduced by both armies, to counter the German irregular pillbox defence and the impossibility of maintaining line formations on ground full of flooded shell-craters. Waves of infantry were replaced by a thin line of skirmishers leading small columns. Maxse the XVIII Corps commander, called this one of the "distinguishing features" of the attack, along with the revival of the use of the rifle as the primary infantry weapon, the addition of Stokes mortars to creeping barrages and "draw net" barrages, where field guns began a barrage  behind the German front line then crept towards it, which were fired several times before the attack began. The pattern of organisation established before the Battle of Menin Road Ridge, became the standard method of the Second Army.

The plan relied on the use of more medium and heavy artillery, which was brought into the area of the Gheluvelt Plateau from VIII Corps on the right of the Second Army and by removing more guns from the Third and 4th armies further south. The heavy artillery reinforcements were to be used destroy German strong points, pillboxes and machine-gun nests, which were more numerous beyond the German outpost zones already captured and to engage in more counter-battery fire.  and medium and  guns and howitzers were allocated to Plumer for the battle, an equivalent of one artillery piece for every  of the attack front, which was more than double the proportion for the Battle of Pilckem Ridge. The ammunition requirements for a seven-day bombardment before to the assault, was estimated at  rounds, which created a density of fire four times greater than for the attack of 31 July.

X Corps
The three-week operational pause in September originated from Lieutenant-General Thomas Morland and Lieutenant-General William Birdwood, the X Corps and I Anzac Corps commanders, at the conference of 27 August. Decisions over practice barrages and machine-gun barrages were left to the corps commanders. The Second Army and both corps did visibility tests, to decide when zero hour should be set and discussed the use of wireless and gun-carrying tanks with Plumer on 15 September. X Corps issued its first "Instruction" on 1 September, giving times and boundaries to its divisions, with details to follow.

Artillery details covered eight pages and signalling another seven. A Corps Intelligence balloon was arranged to receive light signals and messenger pigeons were issued to corps observers, reporting to a Corps Advanced Intelligence Report Centre, so that information could be collected and circulated swiftly. Delegation forward was demonstrated by the next "Instructions" on 10 September, which gave a framework for the creeping barrage fired by the divisional artillery, the details being left to the divisions, as was harassing fire on German positions. Double bombardment groups, which had been used by X Corps at Messines, were affiliated with divisional headquarters. The X Corps report on the attack of 20 September, stated that success was due to the artillery and machine-gun barrages, the ease of moving troops over rebuilt roads and tracks behind the front and the much better co-operation of infantry, artillery and Royal Flying Corps.

1st Australian Division
On 7 September, the 1st Australian Division commander announced the attack to his staff and next day the ground was studied. "Divisional Order 31" was issued on 9 September, giving the intent of the operation and listed neighbouring formations, the placement of brigades and the deployment of the two attacking brigades on a front of one battalion each, with a battalion advancing to the first objective, one moving through it to the second objective and two more to the final objective,  beyond the original front line. A map was appended to the Order showing the red, blue and green lines to be captured. A creeping barrage by the five field artillery brigades in the division and bombardments from artillery under corps and army command was described. Special attention was given to mopping-up procedures and the detailing of particular units, to capture selected German strong points.

On 11 September "Divisional Order 32", detailed the march to the divisional assembly area near Ypres and on 14 September "Instruction No. 2" of Order 31, added details of the artillery plan and laid down routes for the approach march. Coloured patches corresponding to the objective lines were to be worn on helmets and the 1st Australian Infantry Brigade was to be held back, ready to reinforce the attacking brigades or to defeat German counter-attacks. Compasses were issued to officers and white tape was to be used to mark approach routes, jumping-off points and unit boundaries, to help the infantry keep direction. Troops attacking the first objective, were ordered not to fix bayonets until the barrage commenced, to increase the possibility of surprise.

"Instruction No. 4" comprised intelligence instructions for the questioning of prisoners and the gleaning and dissemination of useful information. Men identified by armbands were to scour the battlefield for German documents, using maps of German headquarters, signals offices and dugouts; information was to be sent to a divisional collecting point. "Instruction No. 5" was devoted to liaison, with officers attached to brigades, to report to the divisional commander. Brigades liaised with the other Australian brigades and those of neighbouring divisions, battalions liaising in the same manner. Artillery liaison officers were appointed down to infantry brigades and battalion and company officers were told to keep close to artillery Forward Observation Officers. "Instruction no. 6" covered engineer and pioneer work for the building of strong points, at the places determined in "Divisional Order 31". An Engineer Field Company was attached to each brigade and the Pioneer Battalion was made responsible for the maintenance and extension of communications, including tramways, mule and duckboard tracks and communication trenches. Two supply routes were defined and next day, engineer officers were added to the liaison system within brigade headquarters.

Communication within the division was addressed by "Instruction No. 7" on 16 September, which discussed telegraph, telephones and cable burying; visual communication via six reporting stations; wireless and power buzzers. Separate lines were laid for artillery use and aircraft liaison followed  with infantry battalions provided with panels to signal from the ground. "Instruction No. 8" covered medical arrangements from Regimental Aid Posts, (with a medical officer and four squads of stretcher-bearers each) back to Casualty Clearing Stations along marked evacuation routes. "Instruction No. 9" laid down the use of machine-guns in the attack;  were to be part of the creeping barrage, from machine-gun companies attached to each brigade. The Divisional Machine-Gun Officer was to keep close touch with brigade headquarters, to be ready to act on SOS calls from the infantry. "Instruction No. 10" was a "Summary of Arrangements for Co-operation between Infantry and Artillery on Forthcoming Operations" and detailed artillery liaison down to battalions. A brigade of field artillery with three batteries of  field guns and one of  howitzers was added to the barrage and made available to artillery liaison officers at brigades as needed. Divisional headquarters had two  howitzer batteries with eight guns for the same purpose.

"Instruction No. 12" was issued on 17 September and covered equipment to be carried into action, the attachment of a troop of Light Horse to Major-General Harold Walker, the Divisional commander, to carry orders and restrictions on the use of telephones in the front line, intended to obstruct German eavesdropping. Instructions  18 September and the start of the attack, covered late changes, such as reserving the use of telephones to unit commanders and the provision of two wireless tanks, for the south-east corner of Glencorse Wood for local use and as an emergency station for both Australian divisions.

To the right of 1st Australian Division was the 23rd Division, which followed the same pattern of planning and organisation. The warning order was issued on 3 September and the divisional plan issued on 6 September. Appendices followed from 9 to 15 September, with some amendments on 17 September. On 8 September X Corps instructed that divisional commanders were to take over their fronts on 13 September, before the divisions there were relieved by the attacking divisions and that brigade headquarters were to be taken over on 16 September. Intelligence gathering continued until the attack to amend plans. When aerial photographs showed that ground around Dumbarton Lakes, south of Inverness Copse was far muddier than expected, the plan was changed so that the infantry battalions sidestepped the marsh.

On 11 September the 23rd Division commander, Major-General James Babington, pointed out to the X Corps commander, Lieutenant-General Thomas Morland, that he was leaving the arrangements to deal with German counter-attacks to his brigade commanders but that the area suggested by X Corps HQ was on a forward slope and he wanted to put the reserve behind the blue (second) line. Morland reiterated his intent to ensure that the counter-attack reserve was ready to intervene while German troops were reorganising, though the means to achieve this were left to Babington's discretion and that the 23rd Division reserve brigade would conduct any prepared counter-attacks. A "Final Order" was issued on 17 September as a summary, adding information about the Bavarian Ersatz Division opposite and possible German counter-attack routes. It stressed that observation was needed over the Reutelbeek and Kronnebeek valleys when the final objective was consolidated and that situation reports were to be sent when brigades had reached their objectives and at two-hourly intervals afterwards. Both divisions reached all their objectives on 20 September and the 23rd Division "Comment on Operations" was published as a Second Army document. The pattern for subsequent British attacks was established and Second Army orders and artillery instructions became formulaic, usually beginning with  the stages of the attack being described in relation to it. Orders were terse statements of the timetable, which corps were involved, any corps movements and when the attack would take place.

German defensive changes, late 1917

22 September

After the defeat of Menin Road Ridge on 20 September, German defensive tactics were changed. In August, German front-line divisions had two regiments in the front line with the third regiment in reserve. The front battalions had been relieved much more frequently than expected, due to constant British bombardments, the wet weather and units becoming mixed up. The regiments in reserve had not been able to intervene quickly and the front battalions had been unsupported until  divisions arrived, some hours after the commencement of the British attack. The deployment was changed to increase the number of troops in the front zone.

The battalions were to move forward successively, to engage fresh enemy battalions which had leapfrogged through those that had delivered the first attack.  divisions were to deliver an organised attack with artillery support later in the day, before the British could consolidate their new line. The change was intended to remedy the neutralisation of the front division reserves which had been achieved by the British artillery on 20 September, so that they could intervene before the  divisions arrived. On 22 September, new tactical requirements were laid down by the 4th Army, more artillery counter-bombardment was to be used between British attacks, half counter-battery and half against infantry, increased raiding was ordered, to induce the British to hold their positions in greater strength, to give the German artillery a denser target; better artillery observation was demanded in the battle zone, to increase the accuracy of German artillery fire when British troops advanced into it and quicker counter-attacks were to be made.

30 September

Following the costly defeats on 20 September and at Polygon Wood on 26 September, the German commanders made more changes to the defensive organisation and altered their counter-attack tactics, which had been negated by the British combination of limited attack and much greater artillery firepower than had been available in August. German  divisions had engaged in "an advance to contact during mobile operations", which had achieved several costly defensive successes during August. German counter-attacks in September had been "assaults on reinforced field positions", due to the short British infantry advances and emphasis on defeating  (hasty counter-attacks). The period of dry weather and clear skies which began in early September, had greatly increased the effectiveness of British air observation and the accuracy of artillery fire. German counter-attacks had been costly defeats, after arriving too late to take advantage of the disorganisation of the British infantry. The changes in British tactics meant that they had swiftly established a defence in depth on reverse slopes, protected by standing barrages, in dry, clear, weather with specialist counter-attack reconnaissance aircraft for the observation of German troop movements and improved contact-patrol and ground-attack operations by the RFC. Such German artillery that was able to fire, despite British counter-battery bombardment, became unsystematic and inaccurate due to uncertainty over the whereabouts of German infantry, just when British infantry benefited from the opposite. On 28 September Albrecht von Thaer, Staff Officer at  Wytschaete wrote that the experience was "awful" and that he did not know what to do.

Ludendorff later wrote that he had regularly discussed the situation with Kuhl and Loßberg, to try to find a remedy for the overwhelming British attacks. Ludendorff ordered a strengthening of the forward garrisons by the ground holding divisions, all machine-guns, including those of the support and reserve battalions of the front line regiments, were sent into the forward zone to form a cordon of four to eight guns every . Between British attacks, the  divisions were to make more spoiling attacks.

A 4th Army operation order of 30 September pointed out that the German position in Flanders was restricted by the local topography, the proximity of the coast and the Dutch frontier, which made local withdrawals impossible. The instructions of 22 September were to be followed, with more bombardment by field artillery, using at least half of the heavy artillery ammunition for observed fire on infantry positions in captured pillboxes, command posts, machine-gun nests and on duckboard tracks and field railways. Gas bombardment was to be increased on forward positions and artillery emplacements, when the wind allowed. Every effort was to be made to induce the British to reinforce their forward positions, where the German artillery could engage them, by making spoiling attacks to recapture pillboxes, improve defensive positions and harass the British infantry with patrols and diversionary bombardments. From  the Germans attacked and counter-attacked at least  BEF military intelligence predicted the German changes in an intelligence summary of 1 October and foresaw the big German counter-attack planned for 4 October.

7–13 October

On 7 October, the 4th Army abandoned the reinforcement of the front defence zone, after the Battle of Broodseinde, the "black day" of 4 October. Front line regiments were dispersed again with reserve battalions moved back behind the artillery protective line and  divisions organised to intervene as swiftly as possible, despite the risk of being devastated by the British artillery. Counter-battery fire against British artillery was to be increased to protect the  divisions as they advanced. An  division was to be placed behind each front-line division, with instructions to ensure that it reached the British before they could consolidate.

The revised defensive scheme was promulgated on 13 October, despite the reluctance of Rupprecht to accept the changes. Artillery-fire was to replace the machine-gun defence of the forward zone as far as possible and Rupprecht believed that the reduction in counter-battery fire would allow the British artillery too much freedom to operate. The thin line of sentries of one or two  (thirteen men and a light machine-gun in each) in company sectors proved inadequate, as the British were easily able to attack them and lift prisoners. At the end of October, the sentry line was replaced by a conventional outpost system of double . The necessity of such reinforcement was caused by the weather, devastating British artillery-fire and the decline in the numbers and quality of German infantry. Concealment was emphasised, to protect the divisions from British fire power, by avoiding anything resembling a trench system in favour of dispersal in crater fields. Such a method was only made feasible by the rapid rotation of units; battalions of the front-divisions were relieved after two days and divisions every six days.

Operational surprise, Cambrai, 1917

3rd Army

The plan for the Battle of Cambrai originated on 23 August 1917, with a proposal from Brigadier-General H. D. Du Pree of the IV Corps of the Third Army, for a surprise attack with tank support near Flesquières, to exploit the lack of German artillery in the area and the relatively good going for tanks. The Third Army HQ (commanded by General Julian Byng) and Brigadier-General Henry Tudor, Commander Royal Artillery (CRA) of the 9th (Scottish) Division did much to expand the proposal, which was then planned in the systematic manner of the British offensives earlier in the year, founded on the Stationery Section (S.S.) manuals which had derived from analysis of the Battle of the Somme and French experience. Draft schemes were issued to Corps, containing the objectives and the achievement of surprise by dispensing with a preliminary bombardment. Infantry were to advance behind a mass of tanks, to the first two objective lines (blue and brown) by leapfrogging. An advance to the red line and beyond was to be undertaken by cavalry, a novel feature intended to be made possible by the surprise and swift initial advance, with the details to be decided by the Corps. The third part of the plan required the cavalry to envelop Cambrai, followed up by infantry, beginning in the south with III Corps then successively to the north by IV, VI and XVII Corps.

 of 25 October, was arranged by Army conferences at which the objectives were given by Byng, who left the means to achieve them to be decided by the Corps commanders. Third Army Headquarters then issued memoranda, drawing attention to certain aspects of the plan. "Third Army Instructions To Cavalry Corps" were sent by Byng to its commander Lieutenant-General C. T. Mc M. Kavanagh on 13 November, covering liaison with tanks and infantry and describing the role of the cavalry, to advance about  after zero hour, through the infantry at Masnières and Marcoing to surround Cambrai. On 14 November, III Corps was told when to move its reserve, the 29th Division forward, to capture the canal crossings at Masnières and Marcoing. The RFC, Tank Corps and Royal Artillery, arranged their plans through Third Army HQ, rather than direct with corps headquarters, to ensure that the new artillery techniques, the role of the tanks in creating gaps in the German wire ahead of the infantry and organised air operations over the battlefield, were co-ordinated.

Artillery planning for the attack saw the greatest change in technique, which was intended to exploit the tactical potential of Predicted fire (silent registration). The artillery plan for the first part of the attack was decided by Third Army HQ and no discretion was allowed to Corps to make changes, until German resistance after the commencement of the operation, required Corps to resume tactical control. The use of silent registration and the need for secrecy and uniformity of practice, led to the Third Army HQ issuing detailed instructions (Third Army Artillery ) governing the use of artillery before the offensive and the combination of suppressive, rather than destructive artillery-fire with tank action, to clear the way for the infantry advance and cavalry exploitation.

IV Corps

Corps planning for the Cambrai operation followed the routine established in early 1917. IV Corps (Lieutenant-General Sir Charles Woolcombe) issued its draft plan on 31 October, giving the concept of the plan, the three stages and the troops allotted, with the measures needed to prepare the area and plan the assembly of troops. Administrative, intelligence and signalling instructions, were issued by the respective corps staff branches. During planning, IV Corps issued more instructions regarding the role of its divisions, particularly for the period after the Hindenburg Support Trench system was captured, laid down that the Tank Corps was to use all its tanks on the first day and that the troops involved in the attack, would move to the front immediately before the attack, rather than a few days previous, to be fresh and to prevent the Germans making deductions from prisoners. This decision gave the infantry more time for training with the tanks and responsibility for this was delegated to infantry division commanders and the tank brigade attached to IV Corps.

The Tank Corps also followed this routine, by sending recommendations about the distribution of its units, the training of tanks and affiliated infantry for approval by the Third Army HQ. The proposals were based on the "Notes" issued on 4 October, which summarised the experience gained by the Tank Corps since April and amendments were issued on 10 November. The Third Army HQ issued two "Notes" on 30 October, covering tank-infantry training and operations. In "Tank and Infantry Operations Without Methodical Artillery Preparation" of 30 October, each corps was told to keep the instructions secret to ensure surprise, that tank sections should attack specific areas, objectives should be reserved for an echelon of tanks each, that an advanced tank should keep German heads down, while the main body and infantry crossed German trenches, that the main body of tanks should stay on the British side of the German line being attacked, that tanks would be allotted according to the number of German positions in the area and work in threes to cover  of front. Only a platoon of infantry should work with each tank, to avoid bunching when moving through lanes in barbed wire made by the tanks and that infantry should move in section files. Further sections described the care needed when tanks crossed barbed wire, so that following tanks would not pull up the wire, the use and marking of trenches filled by fascines and the principles of tank-infantry co-operation.

In "Notes on Infantry and Tank Operations" 30 October, Third Army HQ described the characteristics of the tanks and the Tank Corps organisation, how to identify individual tanks, the frontage per tank, formations, assembly, concealment, the method of moving forward to the attack, tank objectives, infantry co-operation, portage of ammunition, wire and trench crossing, signalling, counter-battery work, staff liaison and reporting and stated that success depended on the mechanical fitness of the tanks, efficient assembly on the battlefield, the selection of obvious objectives, the use of prepared and concealed approaches and thorough briefing of all tank and infantry officers. Third Army HQ delegated operational control of the tanks to III and IV Corps, which allocated tanks to their divisions for division commanders to arrange training. Each corps sent a staff liaison officer to the tank brigade headquarters attached.

The RFC continued its development of ground attack operations, with a more systematic organisation of duties and coverage of the battlefield, drawing on the lessons of the Third Battle of Ypres and the pioneering work done during the capture of Hill 70 in August. The smaller area of operations at Cambrai and the growth of the RFC meant that more aircraft could be allotted to each task than in Flanders. The most notable difference in the air plan for the battle was in artillery co-operation, since air activity over the Cambrai area before the offensive, was restricted (along with the quantity of artillery and ammunition expenditure) to the usual amount to maintain secrecy, leaving no time before the battle for artillery registration. The positions of active German artillery batteries were to be observed once the battle began and prompt corrections to the artillery were to be given for counter-battery neutralisation and for destructive fire against groups of German infantry. Four squadrons of fighters were reserved for ground attacks against artillery, machine-gun nests and troops, according to a plan using lists of the most dangerous German artillery positions. Ground attack squadrons were given three groups of ground targets, to be patrolled all day and a forward aerodrome was established at Bapaume to allow aircraft to resume patrols and attacks quickly.

51st (Highland) Division
The 51st (Highly) Division moved from the Ypres front in early October and received a surprise, when warned of another operation, having already had  in 1917. To inflict a similar surprise on the Germans, the division stayed at Hermaville and a replica of the German defences, was laid out to the west of Arras. To mislead the Germans, the division did not occupy the front line trenches before the attack and observation parties visited the trenches wearing trousers rather than kilts.

Training was conducted on the replica, with the tanks allotted to the division. The 1st Brigade of the Tank Corps, with  supplied a battalion to each of the two attacking infantry brigades. Twelve "Rovers" were to move forward at zero, to crush barbed wire and engage any machine-gun nests found between the German trench lines. About  behind the Rovers, a second wave of  tanks, were to deal with the Germans in trenches up to the blue line. All remaining tanks were to form a third wave and reinforce the first two waves, for the attack on Flesquières Ridge. The first two tanks were to follow up as soon as their infantry reached the first trench.

Due to the number of German communication trenches, sap heads, crater posts, detached posts and subsidiary trenches in the area, the second wave tanks were given specific German positions, routes and positions in villages to deal with, as well as attacking the main Hindenburg trenches. Infantry were to follow  behind, to attack trenches as soon as they were engaged by the tanks and mark gaps in the wire; each tank carried spare ammunition for the infantry. Training in the 51st and 62nd divisions departed from the "Notes" issued by the Tank Corps, by having infantry keep a greater distance from the tanks and moving in lines rather than files, along with the use of Rovers ahead of the Fighting Tanks.

Army Group Crown Prince Rupprecht

That the British offensive at Ypres had ended was considered possible but there was no anticipation of an attack elsewhere and planning had begun for operations in 1918. On 17 November, Rupprecht concluded that large attacks were improbable and that small attacks on the areas of the 6th and 2nd armies were possible, if the British had ended their operations in Flanders. The attack at Cambrai came "as a complete surprise" and Ludendorff criticised the Army Group for being too distracted by the Flanders front. The Army Group and OHL could only react to the British attack on 20 November, by issuing orders for reinforcements to rush to the 2nd Army, although Rupprecht pointed out that the system of rapid relief of divisions in Flanders would break down, if many divisions were removed and that the rail network was overloaded, so that rapid reinforcement of the Cambrai front was not guaranteed. Ludendorff responded by taking additional divisions from Army Group German Crown Prince in the central section of the western front. The next day Rupprecht ordered all of the truck-mounted anti-aircraft guns in the 4th and 6th armies to the 2nd Army for use as anti-tank guns.

On 27 November, Ludendorff, Rupprecht and the Chiefs of Staff of Army Group "German Crown Prince" and the Seventh Army met at the 2nd Army headquarters in Le Cateau. Delays in transporting reinforcements and artillery ammunition were reported by Marwitz and Ludendorff agreed to the postponement of a counter-offensive until 30 November. A more ambitious plan, to cut off the British troops in the Bourlon salient and roll up the British line northwards, replaced the original plan to push the British back behind the  defences, when Rupprecht was able to offer two more divisions from Flanders.  The main effort was to be made by  Caudry and Busigny, attacking west towards the village of Metz, capturing Flesquières and Havrincourt Wood from the south.  Arras was to attack southwards west of Bourlon Wood, after the main attack had begun. Fresh divisions from Rupprecht and OHL Reserve were to be ready to exploit success. Rupprecht wrote that the recovery of the  positions was necessary. A subsidiary attack was to be prepared by the 2nd Army north of St. Quentin, if a great success was achieved.

The 2nd Army held the western front from just south of Arras, to the Oise north of Barisis. Many of the 2nd Army divisions had been exchanged for exhausted divisions from Flanders. On 17 November, the 2nd Army estimated that it would be another fortnight before 54th Division and 183rd Division would be battle-worthy, the 9th Reserve Division was only capable of holding a quiet front and the 20th  Division had been so damaged at Ypres that it was to be sent to the eastern front as soon the 107th Division arrived from Russia. None of the divisions in  Arras were considered battle-worthy after their time in Flanders.

The delivery of reinforcements and ammunition was not sufficient for an early counter-attack and 30 November was set for the counter-offensive, after several delays requested by the 2nd Army staff. A more ambitious counter-offensive than originally envisaged, discussed at the meeting on 27 November by Ludendorff, Rupprecht and Marwitz with their staffs, required  Arras to participate despite the tiredness of its divisions, which had been made worse by the delay in preparing the counter-offensive. Metz en Couture and the higher ground around Flesquières were  behind the British front line and doubts about the divisions in  Arras, despite the need for them to participate in the bigger operation, led to a compromise, in which an experimental deployment for the attack behind a smokescreen and a delay of the advance until after the attack by  Caudry and Busigny had taken effect were substituted for the original plan.

In November,  Arras had been transferred from the 6th Army further north, holding the area from Inchy to the Arras–Cambrai road near Guémappe. Caudry held the area south of Guémappe to Bellicourt, beyond which was  St Quentin. The unconventional British attack on 20 November obtained strategic, operational and a measure of tactical surprise, inflicting heavy losses and taking ground quickly.

By 23 November, reinforcements reaching the 2nd Army were sufficient for two new groups, based on the XXIII Reserve Corps ( Busigny) to the south of  Caudry, opposite the British VII Corps and  Lewarde (XVIII Corps), which took over the right hand divisions of  Arras. Eighteen divisions were massed on the Cambrai front, for the 30 November counter-offensive. Ten divisions were considered battle worthy, although most of the divisions in  Arras were exhausted from the defensive battles around Bourlon Wood. The 79th Reserve Division was in 2nd Army reserve and eight more divisions were available in the Army Group and OHL reserves.

In the rush to prepare for the original counter-attack and then the bigger counter-offensive for 30 November, after the success of the defensive battles around Bourlon Wood and rapid arrival of reinforcements,  batteries were emplaced in seven days in one area and sixty  batteries in three days. The three attacking  and their divisions, had to amend their plans twice before the attack could commence. The original  Caudry plan  (Operation Twilight of the Gods) became  as more divisions were added to the attack;  and divisional boundaries adapted to their arrival.  Busigny reported that transport difficulties, had made it impossible to distribute sufficient ammunition to its divisions. In  Caudry, some of the artillery and mortars arrived too late to be well placed, the attacking infantry lacked time to study the plan and rehearse and some flame throwers had no fuel until the last minute.

German Division
The outpost line was manned at night and the strong points permanently. The division improved its positions by building elaborate barbed wire obstacles and dug more trenches and dugouts, despite the frequency with which British artillery destroyed them. Vigorous patrolling and prisoner snatches, challenged British dominance of no-man's-land. The 54th Division had engaged French tanks during the Nivelle Offensive and afterwards had more anti-tank training. The 9th Reserve Division moved to the Cambrai front from Flanders, at the end of September, having been depleted in the fighting around Zandvoorde and adopted the same raiding policy of the 54th Division, which led to the discovery in no-man's-land of a dead British Tank Corps soldier on 28 October. The news was passed on to intelligence staffs who discounted it. Demand for ammunition in Flanders was so great that larger more revealing raids on the Cambrai front were not possible.

By 29 November the German 2nd Army had eighteen divisions around Cambrai. After the defensive fighting of  the divisions had to prepare hurriedly for the counter-offensive of 30 November, which was the first offensive against the British since the Second Battle of Ypres in April 1915. Built-up areas were to be bombarded by howitzers and by-passed by the foremost infantry and then attacked from all sides by following troops.

Poor weather and lack of time inhibited training but some rehearsals were possible, using  personnel as instructors; the 34th Division managed to rehearse infiltration tactics on 28 November. German air units were concentrated in the area but poor weather hampered air reconnaissance by both sides. Some German divisions had such casualties in the earlier fighting that their role was reduced. In  Caudry, the 107th Division was ordered to conform to the advances of its neighbouring divisions and occupy higher ground near Marcoing. The 9th Reserve Division was only to advance to the Trescault heights, after the 28th Division and 220th Division had made the initial break-in. In  Arras, the 214th Division was left out of the attack and other tired divisions given limited tasks.

Analysis
The new German area defence system failed badly at Verdun 15 December 1916 and again at Arras 9 April 1917, when troops had been kept in obsolete defences and by the belated commitment of the counter-attacking divisions, which were held too far back, against Allied attacking methods and equipment which were much improved from 1916. The new system was made to work in time for the French part of the Nivelle Offensive in April. The calamitous losses endured by the seven German front-holding divisions on 9 April were not repeated, although the defensive operations in later April and May were still costly in infantry casualties. Most of the ground behind the new front position chosen by Loßberg and made ready by 13 April, was held for the remainder of the battle.

In 1996, Prior and Wilson wrote that the Third Battle of Ypres was called a British failure by many writers. Harris and Sheffield called it a Pyrrhic victory. Research over the last 25 years suggests that British and German commanders thought carefully about what they were doing, learned quickly and had efficient forces capable of quick changes of method. The capture of Passchendaele Ridge was extremely difficult, due to the skill and determination of the German army and the huge problem of waging war without great advantages in technology or tactics. The course of the Nivelle Offensive earlier in the year, suggest that a campaign of this nature was unavoidable. Limited operations like the Battle of Messines, the Battle of Hill 70, the Second Offensive Battle of Verdun and the Battle of Malmaison, were strikingly successful but were insufficient to force the German army out of France; this was not because of poor leadership but due a form of warfare conducted with means made available by industrialisation, fought by closely matched opponents, who made mistakes but mostly fought with determination, using all the skill and technical measures they could find. The defensive methods used by the German army at Arras after 9 April were not superseded until changes were imposed by Ludendorff after the defeat at Broodseinde on 4 October.

In 2018, Jonathan Boff wrote that after the war the  official historians, many of whom were former staff officers, ascribed the tactical changes in the wake of the Battle of Polygon Wood (26 September) and their reversal after the Battle of Broodseinde on 4 October, to Loßberg. The other German commanders were exculpated and a false impression created that OHL was operating in a rational manner, when Ludendorff imposed another defensive scheme on 7 October. Boff called this narrative facile, because it avoided the problem faced by the Germans in late 1917. OHL sent orders to change tactics again days before Loßberg had issued orders to the 4th Army but he was blamed for them. Boff also doubted that all of the divisions in Flanders could act quickly on top-down demands for changes. The tempo of British attacks and attrition led to an increase of six divisions in the 4th Army by 10 October but that they were either novice divisions deficient in training or veteran divisions with low morale. The Germans were seeking tactical changes for an operational dilemma, because no operational answer existed. On 2 October, Rupprecht ordered the 4th Army HQ to avoid over-centralising command only to find that Loßberg had issued an artillery plan detailing the deployment of individual batteries. The British retained the strategic initiative but failed to capture the Belgian coast and the U-boat bases, although this was due more to the difficulties of wet weather than the effectiveness of German resistance.

The Battle of Cambrai showed continuity with the previous Franco-British offensives in 1917. Novel features, mainly in the use of artillery, tank-infantry co-operation, air power over the battlefield and the holding back of the assault divisions until just before the attack, came from the evolution of technique. The experience of trying to move heavy artillery forward during the advance to the Hindenburg line in March was found particularly useful. Tanks were no longer unusual and their presence in large numbers, left artillery free for counter-battery neutralisation rather than destruction of barbed wire and other field fortifications, which made the surprise attack feasible, given the secret deployment of artillery reinforcements. The attempt to surprise the German defence precluded extensive work on transport and supply infrastructure behind the front, which caused the same sort of difficulties in maintaining momentum that crater fields did elsewhere in 1917. After the first couple of days, the battle became another wearing-out operation, using up German reinforcements as they arrived, which when suspended on 28 November, gave the Germans time to mass for a counter-offensive on 30 November. More German forces were available due to the closure of the eastern front and the end of the period when German forces were pinned down by the battle in Flanders. The course of the German counter-offensive, which was the biggest German attack in the west since Verdun in 1916, demonstrated that the constraints on advances encountered by the British and French armies were not unique. The ground gained in the German attack of 30 November, was much less than intended and part of it was then lost to British counter-attacks. After this limited success, attrition tactics resumed, until the British abandoned the salient at Bourlon Wood.

The significance of the Battle of Cambrai, lay in the confounding of German defensive assumptions by the achievement of operational surprise, for the first time since 1915. In 1919 McPherson wrote that in the aftermath of the battle, "it was plain that the defensive must always contemplate the possibility of having large sections of the front broken, and of having to repair those breaches by considerable counter offensives....", which caused the German command to divert resources into anti-tank defences and end the skimping of artillery and ammunition in some areas to reinforce others. After the battle Rupprecht wrote "Wherever the ground offers suitable going for tanks, surprise attacks like this may be expected... there can be no more mention of quiet fronts.", which led to a belief among many German commanders that a defensive strategy in 1918 would be futile. The German commanders concluded that the speed of the Cambrai counter-offensive had contributed to surprise but that last-minute changes to plans, had diverted planning staffs from important details. Lack of time to study the ground and rehearse, had slowed the tempo of the attack and forced junior officers and NCO's to exercise conspicuous leadership, causing them heavy losses. The physical demands made on troops and horses to arrive in time for the offensive, lessened the energy of their attack, which rapidly broke down and many horses died of exhaustion, which contributed to local ammunition shortages. The methods used by the Germans at Cambrai, were incorporated into the new manual for offensive operations,  (The Attack in Position War) of January 1918, which laid down German offensive methods for the remainder of the war.

See also

 Western Front (World War I)
 Brazil during World War I
 Portugal in World War I

Notes

Footnotes

References

Books
 
 
 
 
 
 
 
 
 
 
 
 
 
 
 
 
 
 
 
 
 
 
 
 
 
 
 
 
 
 
 
 
 
 
 
 

Theses

Further reading

External links
 Collectors' Guide to the British Official History
 Passchendaele – Canada's other Vimy Ridge, Leach, N.

1917 in France
Conflicts in 1917
Ypres Salient
Battle of Passchendaele
Battles of World War I involving Australia
Battles of World War I involving Canada
Tactical
Battles of World War I involving Germany
Battles of World War I involving New Zealand
Battles of World War I involving South Africa
Battles of World War I involving the United Kingdom
Battles of the Western Front (World War I)